Al-Kindi indicates affiliation with the Arabian Kinda tribe.

People with the surname include:
 Hujr ibn 'Adi al-Kindi, a companion of the Islamic prophet Muhammad and Ali.
 Ya'qub ibn Ishaq al-Kindi, known as "the Philosopher of the Arabs", was a Muslim scientist, philosopher, mathematician, physician, and musician.
 Miqdad ibn al-Aswad al-Kindi, a companion of the Islamic prophet Muhammad.
 Raja Ibn Haywah al-Kindi: Islamic jurist and Arabic calligraphist.
 Zaynab bint ʿUmar b. al-Kindī, woman hadith scholar, teacher of Al-Dhahabi.
 Abd al-Masih ibn Ishaq al-Kindi, Christian theologian.
 Muhammad ibn Yusuf al-Kindi, Egyptian historian.
 Alkindi (fencer), an Indonesian Olympic fencer.

See also
 Kindi (disambiguation)
Kunud

Arabic-language surnames
Kindi